Cláudia Isabel Leiria Madeira (4 October 1976 – 19 December 2022), known professionally as Claudisabel,  was a Portuguese singer.

In 2010, she competed in the Festival da Canção where she reached the semifinals with the song Contra Tudo e Todos.

Claudisabel was killed in a car accident on 19 December 2022, at the age of 46.

Discography
 Dizias tu, pensava eu (1995)
 Pensei com o coração (1998)
 Preciso de um herói (1999)
 Meu Sonho Azul (2002)
 Preto no branco (2006)
 Quem és tu (2009)
 Contra tudo e todos (2010)
 Condenada (2020)

References 

1976 births
2022 deaths
People from Faro, Portugal
20th-century Portuguese women singers
21st-century Portuguese women singers
Road incident deaths in Portugal